The 1914–15 Niagara Purple Eagles men's basketball team represented Niagara University during the 1914–15 NCAA college men's basketball season. The head coach was A.V. Barrett, coaching his fourth season with the Purple Eagles.

Schedule

|-

References

Niagara Purple Eagles men's basketball seasons
Niagara
Niagara Purple Eagles men's basketball
Niagara Purple Eagles men's basketball